Dustin Brown and Rainer Eitzinger were the defending champions, but decided not to start this year.James Cerretani and David Škoch defeated Adil Shamasdin and Lovro Zovko 6–1, 6–4 to win the tournament.

Seeds

Draw

Draw
{{16TeamBracket-Compact-Tennis3-Byes
| RD1=First round
| RD2=Quarterfinals
| RD3=Semifinals
| RD4=Finals

| RD1-seed01=1
| RD1-team01= A Shamasdin L Zovko
| RD1-score01-1=6
| RD1-score01-2=6
| RD1-score01-3= 
| RD1-seed02= 
| RD1-team02= C Gârd D Inglot
| RD1-score02-1=3
| RD1-score02-2=4
| RD1-score02-3= 

| RD1-seed03= 
| RD1-team03= N Mektić A Veić
| RD1-score03-1=3
| RD1-score03-2=6
| RD1-score03-3=[10]
| RD1-seed04= 
| RD1-team04= F Škugor I Zovko
| RD1-score04-1=6
| RD1-score04-2=3
| RD1-score04-3=[3]

| RD1-seed05=3
| RD1-team05= P Riba G Trujillo-Soler
| RD1-score05-1=7
| RD1-score05-2=6
| RD1-score05-3= 
| RD1-seed06= 
| RD1-team06= M Semjan D Sitak
| RD1-score06-1=5
| RD1-score06-2=2
| RD1-score06-3= 

| RD1-seed07= 
| RD1-team07= A Balázs J Pospíšil
| RD1-score07-1=4
| RD1-score07-2=6
| RD1-score07-3=[10]
| RD1-seed08= 
| RD1-team08= G Alcaide P Santos
| RD1-score08-1=6
| RD1-score08-2=2
| RD1-score08-3=[7]

| RD1-seed09=WC
| RD1-team09= R Karanušić V Obradović
| RD1-score09-1=0
| RD1-score09-2=4
| RD1-score09-3= 
| RD1-seed10= 
| RD1-team10= C Rochus
| RD1-score10-1=6
| RD1-score10-2=6
| RD1-score10-3= 

| RD1-seed11=WC
| RD1-team11= N Čačić M Djokovic
| RD1-score11-1=6
| RD1-score11-2=6
| RD1-score11-3= 
| RD1-seed12=4
| RD1-team12= M Raditschnigg S Vagnozzi
| RD1-score12-1=2
| RD1-score12-2=2
| RD1-score12-3= 

| RD1-seed13= 
| RD1-team13= G Olaso D Savić
| RD1-score13-1=5
| RD1-score13-2=1
| RD1-score13-3= 
| RD1-seed14= 
| RD1-team14= I Navarro
| RD1-score14-1=7
| RD1-score14-2=6
| RD1-score14-3= 

| RD1-seed15=WC
| RD1-team15= A Hadad F Krajinović
| RD1-score15-1=4
| RD1-score15-2=67
| RD1-score15-3= 
| RD1-seed16=2
| RD1-team16= J Cerretani D Škoch
| RD1-score16-1=6
| RD1-score16-2=7
| RD1-score16-3= 

| RD2-seed01=1
| RD2-team01= A Shamasdin L Zovko
| RD2-score01-1= 
| RD2-score01-2= 
| RD2-score01-3= 
| RD2-seed02= 
| RD2-team02= N Mektić A Veić
| RD2-score02-1=w/o
| RD2-score02-2= 
| RD2-score02-3= 

| RD2-seed03=3
| RD2-team03= P Riba G Trujillo-Soler
| RD2-score03-1=65
| RD2-score03-2=6
| RD2-score03-3=[10]
| RD2-seed04= 
| RD2-team04= G Alcaide P Santos
| RD2-score04-1=7
| RD2-score04-2=4
| RD2-score04-3=[8]

| RD2-seed05= 
| RD2-team05= C Rochus
| RD2-score05-1=6
| RD2-score05-2=2
| RD2-score05-3=[10]
| RD2-seed06=WC
| RD2-team06= N Čačić M Djokovic
| RD2-score06-1=1
| RD2-score06-2=6
| RD2-score06-3=[3]

| RD2-seed07= 
| RD2-team07= I Navarro
| RD2-score07-1=3
| RD2-score07-2=0
| RD2-score07-3= 
| RD2-seed08=2
| RD2-team08= J Cerretani D Škoch
| RD2-score08-1=6
| RD2-score08-2=6
| RD2-score08-3= 

| RD3-seed01=1
| RD3-team01= A Shamasdin L Zovko
| RD3-score01-1=2
| RD3-score01-2=7
| RD3-score01-3=[10]
| RD3-seed02=3
| RD3-team02= P Riba G Trujillo-Soler
| RD3-score02-1=6
| RD3-score02-2=5
| RD3-score02-3=[7]

| RD3-seed03= 
| RD3-team03= C Rochus
| RD3-score03-1=2
| RD3-score03-2=2
| RD3-score03-3= 
| RD3-seed04=2
| RD3-team04= J Cerretani D Škoch
| RD3-score04-1=6
| RD3-score04-2=6
| RD3-score04-3= 

| RD4-seed01=1
| RD4-team01=
| RD4-score01-1=1
| RD4-score01-2=4
| RD4-score01-3= 
| RD4-seed02=2
| RD4-team02=

References
 Main Draw

Banja Luka Challenger - Doubles
2010 Doubles